Luis Emanuel Ardente (born 17 September 1981) is an Argentine professional footballer who plays as a goalkeeper for San Telmo.

Career
Ardente had youth spells with Glorias de Tigre, Deportivo Tigre and Tigre. He got his first-team career underway with Tigre in 2001. He remained with the club for ten years, making a total of eighty-three appearances over the course of seasons in Primera B Metropolitana, Primera B Nacional and the Argentine Primera División. Midway through his spell, he was loaned to San Telmo of Primera B Metropolitana. Thirty-nine appearances followed during the 2006–07 season. On 17 July 2011, Ardente joined Argentine Primera División side San Martín. He made his debut on 9 June 2012 versus Unión Santa Fe.

That was the first of one hundred and eighteen matches in his first five campaigns. In April 2016, Ardente netted the first goal of his senior career by converting a penalty during a 4–3 defeat to Huracán. He scored another spot-kick a month later versus Atlético Tucumán. Seven further goals followed across the next two seasons; all of which were penalties. In July 2020, after nine years with the club, Ardente departed to join fellow Primera B Nacional team Estudiantes. He later revealed he had planned to retire at San Martín and only left after they decided not to renew his contract.

Career statistics
.

Honours
Tigre
Primera B Metropolitana (2): 2004 Apertura, 2005 Clausura

References

External links

1981 births
Living people
People from San Isidro, Buenos Aires
Argentine footballers
Association football goalkeepers
Primera Nacional players
Primera B Metropolitana players
Argentine Primera División players
Club Atlético Tigre footballers
San Telmo footballers
San Martín de San Juan footballers
Estudiantes de Río Cuarto footballers
Boca Unidos footballers
Sportspeople from Buenos Aires Province